Koseze Pond, Martinek Pond or Lake Koseze is an artificial pond at the edge of Ljubljana, the capital of Slovenia, between Šiška Hill to the west and the neighborhood of Mostec to the east. It is part of the Tivoli–Rožnik Hill–Šiška Hill Landscape Park and is named after the nearby Koseze neighborhood in Ljubljana's Šiška District. Near Koseze Pond, the Path of Remembrance and Comradeship touches Tivoli–Rožnik Hill–Šiška Hill Landscape Park.

It is fed by Mostec Creek. It was created after a former clay pit at the site, which supplied the brickworks operated by Gustav Tönnies (1814–1886), was closed. The pit was then overgrown by grass, but the Agrostroj company later flooded the area to test irrigation pumps.

Koseze Pond is now used as a recreation area by local residents. In the summer it is used for racing radio-controlled model boats and fishing. Swimming is prohibited due to the poor quality of the water, which is also contaminated by cyanobacteria. In the winter it is used for skating. Koseze Pond is a natural habitat for the edible frog, migrant hawker, common bulrush, and common reed.

See also
 Tivoli Pond, another pond in the Tivoli–Rožnik Hill–Šiška Hill Landscape Park

References

External links 

 Ljubljana: 'Koseški bajer' - ribnik [Ljubljana: Koseze Pond]. 2007. VR panorama. Boštjan Burger. (Rich media - may be viewed with QuickTime). Accessed on 19 February 2012.
 Ljubljana: The Green Ring of Ljubljana. The Path of Remembrance and Comradeship at Koseze Pond. 8 May 2009 – 9 May 2009. VR panorama (surround photography). Boštjan Burger. (Rich media - may be viewed with QuickTime). Accessed on 19 February 2012.

Ponds of Slovenia
Artificial lakes
Geography of Ljubljana
Šiška District
Tivoli–Rožnik Hill–Šiška Hill Natural Park